Edrisi may refer to:
 Edrisi-ye Olya
 Edrisi-ye Sofla